Arthur Mendoza is an American acting coach. He has taught in Los Angeles for 10 years and has worked with such talents as Khandi Alexander, Sasha Barrese, and John Jopson. He has performed in film and Our House and the film Deep Cover.

Education 
Mendoza earned a Bachelor of Arts degree from University of California, Riverside, and an MFA from University of California, San Diego. He studied with Stella Adler for 10 years before becoming the founding principal instructor at her studio in Hollywood.

Career
Mendoza is the founder, artistic director and principal acting instructor at the Actors Circle Theatre in Los Angeles, California. He has directed productions at the Actors Circle Theatre, including The Glass Menagerie.

Mendoza coaches at the Santa Monica Playhouse, continuing his and Stella Adler's legacy of the Stanislavsky Method, finding an indirect pathway to emotional expression via physical action.

Filmography

Film

Television

References

External links
 

American male stage actors
Living people
Year of birth missing (living people)
University of California, Riverside alumni
University of California, San Diego alumni
American acting coaches
People from Loma Linda, California